Swansea Heads is a locality on the Swansea peninsula between Lake Macquarie and the Pacific Ocean in New South Wales, Australia. It is part of Greater Newcastle, City of Lake Macquarie local government area. The Aboriginal people, in this area, the Awabakal, were the first people of this land.

Aboriginal middens were excavated in the area in 1972.

In May 2014 sinkholes appeared near houses due to subsidence into the abandoned Swansea coal mine.

References

External links
 History of Swansea Heads (Lake Macquarie City Library)
 Swansea Heads Beach

Suburbs of Lake Macquarie